John Kolosci (born November 26, 1974) is a retired American mixed martial artist. A professional from 2003 until 2011, he competed for the UFC, Bellator, Strikeforce, the XFC, and was a competitor on The Ultimate Fighter, fighting for Team Serra.

The Ultimate Fighter
Kolosci was able to defeat his first round opponent, Billy Miles, via Guillotine choke in the first round. In the second round, he fought Mac Danzig and was defeated by Rear naked choke in the first round, eliminating him from contention.

In the semifinal round, fighter Matt Arroyo suffered a rib injury and elected to pull out of the competition. In a meeting to decide his replacement, Kolosci was the only fighter to express enthusiasm at the prospect of fighting Danzig and was granted the opportunity by UFC president Dana White. In the rematch, Danzig was able to secure a victory, once again by rear naked choke in round 1.

At The Ultimate Fighter Finale, Kolosci lost to Matt Arroyo via armbar submission at 4:42 of the first round.

Personal life
John and his girlfriend Cathy were married on November 20, 2009, in the ring during the intermission of the Hoosier Fight Club’s premier night.

Mixed martial arts record

|-
|Loss
|align=center|15–9
|Ryan Thomas
|Submission (reverse triangle choke)
|XFC 15: Tribute
|
|align=center|1
|align=center|4:46
|Tampa, Florida, United States
|Catchweight (180 lbs) bout.
|-
|Win
|align=center|15–8
|Dan Bolden 
|Decision (split) 
|Hoosier FC 9: Fall Brawl 
| 
|align=center|3
|align=center|5:00
|Valparaiso, Indiana, United States
|
|-
|Loss
|align=center|14–8
|Forrest Petz
|TKO (strikes)
|Hoosier FC 7: Validation 
|
|align=center|2
|align=center|0:57
|Valparaiso, Indiana, United States
|
|-
|Loss
|align=center|14–7
|Kenny Robertson
|Submission (americana)
|Bellator 25
|
|align=center|2
|align=center|2:41
|Chicago, Illinois, United States
|
|-
|Win
|align=center|14–6
|Luigi Fioravanti
|Submission (rear-naked choke)
|Hoosier FC 4: Showdown at the Steel Yard 
|
|align=center|1
|align=center|0:42
|Gary, Indiana, United States
|
|-
|Win
|align=center|13–6
|William Hill
|Decision (split)
|Hoosier FC 2: It's On
|
|align=center|3
|align=center|5:00
|Hammond, Indiana, United States
|
|-
|Loss
|align=center|12–6
|Shamar Bailey
|Decision (unanimous)
|Strikeforce: Fedor vs. Rogers
|
|align=center|3
|align=center|5:00
|Hoffman Estates, Illinois, United States
|
|-
|Win
|align=center|12–5
|Scott Sands
|Decision (unanimous)
|Duneland Classic 6
|
|align=center|3
|align=center|5:00
|Crown Point, Indiana, United States
|
|-
|Win
|align=center|11–5
|Jeff Hanks
|Submission (anaconda choke)
|LDIL: Lockdown in Lowell 
|
|align=center|1 
|align=center|N/A 
|Lowell, Indiana, United States
|
|-
|Win
|align=center|10–5
|Rocky France
|Decision (majority)
|GECF 13: Gladiator Elite Cage Fighting 13 
|
|align=center|3
|align=center|5:00
|Warsaw, Indiana, United States
|
|-
|Win
|align=center|9–5
|Jay Finnegan
|Submission (anaconda choke)
|Cage Rage: Kokomo 
| 
|align=center|1 
|align=center|2:01 
|Kokomo, Indiana, United States
|
|-
|Loss
|align=center|8–5
|Matt Arroyo
|Submission (armbar)
|The Ultimate Fighter 6 Finale
|
|align=center|1
|align=center|4:42
|Las Vegas, Nevada, United States
|Return to Welterweight.
|-
|Loss
|align=center|8–4
|William Hill
|TKO (punches)
|IFC: Road to Global Domination
|
|align=center|1
|align=center|1:11
|Belton, Texas, United States
|Light Heavyweight debut.
|-
|Win
|align=center|8–3
|Andre Luis Novoes Pimenta
|Decision (split)
|International MMA Competition 1: Attack
|
|align=center|3
|align=center|N/A
|Chicago, Illinois, United States
|
|-
|Loss
|align=center|7–3
|Bryan Rafiq
|Submission (guillotine choke)
|MARS 4: New Deal
|
|align=center|1
|align=center|2:46
|Tokyo, Japan, Japan
|
|-
|Win
|align=center|7–2
|Seth Kleinbeck
|Decision (unanimous)
|Duneland Classic 4
|
|align=center|3
|align=center|N/A
|Portage, Indiana, United States
|
|-
|Win
|align=center|6–2
|Eric Tavares
|TKO (punches)
|Mix Fighting Championships: Boardwalk Blitz
|
|align=center|3
|align=center|3:17
|Atlantic City, New Jersey, United States
|Return to Middleweight.
|-
|Win
|align=center|5–2
|Mike Todorovic
|TKO (punches)
|SuperBrawl 40
|
|align=center|2
|align=center|2:10
|Hammond, Indiana, United States
|
|-
|Win
|align=center|4–2
|John Sivori
|Decision (majority)
|Euphoria: USA vs. World
|
|align=center|3
|align=center|5:00
|Atlantic City, New Jersey, United States
|Lightweight debut.
|-
|Win
|align=center|3–2
|Adam Verkilen
|TKO
|Xtreme Kage Kombat
|
|align=center|N/A
|align=center|N/A
|Wisconsin, United States
|
|-
|Loss
|align=center|2–2
|Pat O'Malley
|Decision
|Freestyle Combat Challenge 15
|
|align=center|2
|align=center|5:00
|Wisconsin, United States
|
|-
|Loss
|align=center|2–1
|Jason Rigsby
|Submission (rear-naked choke)
|Silverback Classic 18
|
|align=center|2
|align=center|N/A 
|Illinois, United States
|
|-
|Win
|align=center|2–0
|Brent Calloway
|Submission (strikes)
|Absolute Fighting Championships 6
|
|align=center|1
|align=center|3:58
|Fort Lauderdale, Florida, United States
|
|-
|Win
|align=center|1–0
|Roy Nerzig
|Submission (strikes)
|Maximum Combat 6
|
|align=center|1
|align=center|N/A 
|Indiana, United States
|

References

External links
 
 

Living people
American male mixed martial artists
Mixed martial artists from Indiana
Middleweight mixed martial artists
1974 births
Welterweight mixed martial artists
People from Portage, Indiana